Thomas Oxaal (born 21 October 1999) is a Norwegian visually impaired cross-country skier.

Career
Oxaal represented Norway at the 2022 Winter Paralympics and won a silver medal in the 4 × 2.5 kilometre open relay.

References 

Living people
1999 births
People from Sauda
Norwegian male cross-country skiers
Cross-country skiers at the 2022 Winter Paralympics
Paralympic cross-country skiers of Norway
Paralympic silver medalists for Norway
Medalists at the 2022 Winter Paralympics
Paralympic medalists in cross-country skiing
Visually impaired category Paralympic competitors
Sportspeople from Rogaland